Cemais may refer to the following medieval divisions in Wales:

 Cemais (Dyfed)
 Cemais (Anglesey)

See also
 Cemaes, a village on Anglesey
 Kemeys Commander, a village in Monmouthshire